An airport expressway is an expressway connecting to the airport as a road for vehicles going to the airport. 

Airport Expressway may also refer to:

Roads

Canada
The portion of Highway 427 between Highway 401 and Highway 409 in Toronto, Ontario, Canada from 1964 to 1971
Unofficially Ontario Highway 409 or Belfield Expressway is an Airport Expressway as the road connects Highway 401 to Toronto-Pearson International Airport

China
Airport Expressway (Beijing) in Beijing, China

Philippines
Ninoy Aquino International Airport Expressway, an elevated airport expressway in Manila, Philippines
 The portion of Subic–Clark–Tarlac Expressway between Clark South Interchange and Clark North Interchange located in Clark Freeport Zone

Sri Lanka
 Colombo - Katunayake Expressway in Sri Lanka between Bandaranaike International Airport, Katunayake and Colombo

United States
Airport Expressway (Fort Wayne, Indiana) in Fort Wayne, Indiana, United States
The Sam Jones Expressway in Indianapolis, Indiana, United States, formerly known as the Airport Expressway
Airport Expressway in Miami, Florida, United States
A one-mile portion of New York State Route 204 near Rochester, New York, United States

See also
 Airport Parkway